RootsMagic is a genealogy software program designed and written by RootsMagic, Inc, a United States software design and development company founded by Bruce Buzbee in 1987. Bruce originally wrote the program Family Origins.

Features
RootsMagic is a genealogy program that assists family historians in tracking, organizing, printing, and sharing family history.

 The software was originally developed as Windows-only, but is now available in Mac OS X.
 It is designed as a single-file database
 It is set up to import or export data from or to the Ancestry.com website.
 It allows backup to a hard drive, flash drive, or DropBox.
 It has four navigation views: 
 Standard pedigree view, with five or six generations visible;
 Family view (allows to look at the family unit, and navigate back and forth between generations;
 Descendants view (two to seven generations);
 People list view (display a customizable set of facts for the people in database);
 Couple list view (display a list of couples in database)
 "Drag and Drop" feature to allow copying individuals, families, and entire extended families from one database to another.
 It has a function to create user website files, and maintains its own free website (MyRootsMagic.com) for customers to publish their own genealogies.
In 2022 there were three versions of RootsMagic V8 sold in the UK - Basic (£29.95), Standard (£39.95) and Platinum (£49.95) while the U.S. version sold by RootsMagic, Inc cost $39.95 for new users and $29.95 for registered users of previous versions.

History
Retail Version
 RootsMagic version 1.0 was released 2003-02-04
 RootsMagic version 2.0 was released 2004-05-24
 RootsMagic version 3.0 was released 2005-09-08
 RootsMagic version 4.0 was released 2009-03-25
 RootsMagic version 5.0 was released 2011-11-28
 RootsMagic version 6.0 was released 2012-11-19
 RootsMagic version 7.0 was released 2014-11-25
 RootsMagic version 8.0 was released 2021-09-30
 RootsMagic version 9.0 was released 2023-02-27

Free Version
 RootsMagic Essentials was released 2009-11-18
 RootsMagic Essentials was updated with the version 5 release 2011-11-28
 RootsMagic Essentials was updated with the version 6 release 2012-11-19
 RootsMagic Essentials was updated with the version 7 release 2014-11-25
 RootsMagic Essentials 8 was released 2021-09-30
 RootsMagic Essentials 9 was released 2023-02-27

File Format 
RootsMagic 4-8 database design uses SQLite 3 as its database engine so the .rmgc and .rmtree database files it creates are readable using third party SQLite management and development tools.

Platforms 
RootsMagic was designed to run on the Windows and Mac platform, however some users run RootsMagic on Linux machines using Wine.

MacOS 10.12 and above is supported by a native version as of RootsMagic 8.

References

External links 

Genealogy software
Windows-only freeware